Heiko "Ko" Wierenga (6 March 1933 – 21 September 2013) was a Dutch politician and member of the Labour Party (PvdA). He served as the Mayor of the municipality of Enschede from September 1977 until April 1994.

Prior to becoming Mayor, Wierenga served in the House of Representatives from 1967 to 1977. He then worked for the Centraal Bureau voor de Arbeidsvoorziening as leaving the mayor's office in 1994.

Wierenga was honored as a Knight of the Order of the Netherlands Lion on 29 April 1987.

Ko Wierenga died on 21 September 2013 at the age of 80.

References

1933 births
2013 deaths
Mayors of Enschede
Members of the House of Representatives (Netherlands)
Knights of the Order of the Netherlands Lion
Labour Party (Netherlands) politicians
People from Enschede